Gotcha Tchogovadzé (born 11 January 1941) is a retired Georgian academic and diplomat, and former Ambassador of Georgia to France.

In 1971, he organized the Polytechnic Institute and was a founding member of the MIS department, and was elected first chairman.
In 1976 he was awarded the title of professor.
In 1976 he became head of the Chair of the sectoral research laboratory
From 1981 to 1986 he worked in Paris, at UNESCO's Education Sector Informatics Department. 
From 1986 to 1988 he was leading in the Communist Party Central Committee's Department of Education and Science, for many years was a member of the Supreme Soviet of the Georgian Soviet Socialist Republic.
From 1988 to 1994 he was Rector of the Polytechnic Institute.
From 1994 to 2004 he was ambassador in Paris with coaccreditation in Madrid, accredited as permanent representative to UNESCO.
Since 2004 he is employed at the UNESCO, the United Nations Educational, Scientific and Cultural Organization Mission.

Publications 
20 monographs, 6 of the invention and more than 100 scientific works.

References

1941 births
Living people
People from Kutaisi
Ambassadors of Georgia (country) to France
Recipients of the Order of Honor (Georgia)
Commandeurs of the Ordre des Palmes Académiques